The Rheinwesterwald Volcanic Ridge, or more rarely, the Asberg Plateau (Asberg-Hochfläche) is a hill ridge and natural region, roughly 13 kilometres long and 3 to 4 kilometres wide, in the north of the German state of Rhineland-Palatinate and south of North Rhine-Westphalia west of the Rhine, which is adjoined in the south by the Siebengebirge. The name was introduced in the late 1950s together with the natural regional major unit of Niederwesterwald.

The ridge or plateau also bears the regional name of Linzer Höhe ("Linz Hills") south of the Asberg. This name was being used by the 17th century to refer to the area outside the town walls of the church parish of Linz and on the side facing the hills.

Hills 

The hills of the region include the Asberg, the Meerberg, the Minderberg, the Hummelsberg, the Römerich, the Willscheider Berg and the Himberg. In the Siebengebirge Nature Park on the North Rhine-Westphalian side are also the Leyberg, the Himmerich, the Broderkonsberg and the Zickelburg (see also complete list). A majority of the area is counted as part of the forests of Erpeler Kirchspielwald, Dattenberger Wald and Leubsdorfer Wald.

Places 
The settlements of the natural region are Ginsterhahn, Grendel, Hargarten, Kaimig (municipality of St. Katharinen), Kretzhaus (borough of Linz am Rhein), Ober- and Untererl (municipality of Kasbach-Ohlenberg), (southwestern part of) Vettelschoß, Oberkalenborn (municipality of Vettelschoß), Ronigerhof (borough of Linz am Rhein) and Rothe Kreuz (municipality of Leubsdorf).

References

Literature 
 Bruno P. Kremer: Landschaften und Landschaftsformen im Kreis Neuwied. In: Heimat-Jahrbuch des Landkreises Neuwied 2007, pp. 305–310.

External links 
 Rheinwesterwald Volcanic Ridge in the landscape information system of Rhineland-Palatinate

Westerwald
Landscapes of Rhineland-Palatinate
Neuwied (district)